119 Tauri (also known as CE Tauri) is a red supergiant star in the constellation Taurus.

Description

119 Tauri has a spectral class of M2 and a luminosity class of Iab-Ib, intermediate between an intermediate-luminosity supergiant and a less luminous supergiant.  It is approximately 1,800 light years from Earth, and with a colour index of +2.07 it is one of the reddest naked eye stars in the night sky.  It is a similar star to Betelgeuse although redder and more distant.

119 Tauri is classified as a semiregular variable star and has been given the variable star designation CE Tauri.  The General Catalogue of Variable Stars gives a magnitude range from +4.23 to +4.54 with a period of 165 days.  Other published studies find poorly-defined periodicity, but with possible periods around 270 and 1,300 days.  Its infrared magnitude changes much less than the visual magnitude; the visual brightness changes are driven by changes in temperature which shift the proportion of electromagnetic radiation emitted in the visual range.

Occultations
CE Tauri lies 4.6 degrees off the ecliptic. This makes it a candidate for occultations by the Moon and (extremely rarely) by one of the bright planets.

Angular diameter
Although CE Tauri is classified as a pulsating variable, observations using the same equipment and wavelengths have not detected significant changes in the angular diameter over time. Reconstructed images of the surface show bright spots that are attributed to giant convection cells.

Properties
Angular diameter measurements can be combined with absolute observed fluxes to derive an accurate effective temperature, about 3,800 K for 119 Tauri. Combined with a distance, the linear size of the star can be calculated. However, the distance to 119 Tauri is still only known approximately from its Hipparcos parallax. Gaia Data Release 2 gives a distinctly larger parallax, but with even greater uncertainty and flagged as unreliable.

119 Tauri is a pulsating star although the pulsation has not been clearly detected in direct angular measurements. Calculating its physical properties shows that the bolometric luminosity and radius both change by about 10%, with the radius typically being larger at cooler temperatures.

References

M-type supergiants
Asymptotic-giant-branch stars
Semiregular variable stars
Taurus (constellation)
BD+18 0875
Tauri, 119
036389
025945
1845
Tauri, CE